The Shree Shiv Chhatrapati Sports Complex is a sports complex located in Pune, India. The complex is situated about 15 km from Pune downtown and 5 km from Hinjawadi. This complex was the venue for the 2008 Commonwealth Youth Games, Khelo India Youth Games in 2019 and AFC Women's Asian Cup.

History 
This complex was built in 1994 for the National Games 1994, which were hosted by Pune. The 2008 Commonwealth Youth Games were hosted here. In 2008 the World Junior Table Tennis Circuit was successfully held here. The 2009 FIVB Men's Junior World Championship was held here. The city also hosted FIBA Asia Under-16 Championship for Women 2009.

The second edition of the Khelo India Youth Games was kicked off in Shree Shiv Chhatrapati Sports Complex, by Sports Minister, Rajyavardhan Singh Rathore, and then Chief Minister of Maharashtra, Devendra Fadnavis.

The venue is also going to host upcoming 2022 AFC Women's Asian Cup.

Other games 
American Football

Beginning in fall 2012, the Athletics Stadium will undergo a retrofitting and become the host stadium for the Elite Football League of India and the home arena for the Pune Marathas.

Rollball

The 2011 Rollball World Cup was held in this games village. This was the first world cup of Roll Ball. Denmark was the winner of this tournament. Also the 3rd Roll Ball World Cup in 2015 was organized here.

Volleyball

The 2009 FIVB Men's Junior World Championship was held on 31 July 2009 to 9 August 2009. Host India ended 4th in this tournament. This tournament was conducted in Badminton Hall and Boxing Arena. Brazil won this championship.

Facilities

Stadia

Main Stadium

Athletics 

The Athletics stadium has a seating capacity of roughly 11,000 people, and also has flood lights and an 8 lane track.

Football 

The athletics stadium also hosts the I-League matches for Pune F.C. It has also hosted matches for the India national football team. India played against Vietnam in a friendly match over here. India played their first match in the 2012 London Olympic Qualifiers (first round) against Myanmar. India won the game 2–1. India then drew 1–1 with Qatar in the 2012 London Olympic Qualifier (second round) at the stadium. Then during the 2011 Indian Federation Cup the Balewadi Sports Complex co-hosted with the Salt Lake Stadium the Federation Cup group-stages. The Federation Cup is the second most important football competition in India. This stadium will also be the host for upcoming Indian Super League for FC Pune City bought by Bollywood actor Hritik Roshan.

International football matches

Aquatics Centre 

This Aquatics centre contains two 50 x 25m swimming pools, with a seating capacity of 3500. There are also changing rooms available. Seating and lounges are for VIPs. For public usage the pool timings are 6:00 AM – 9:00AM and 3:00 PM – 6:00 PM from Monday to Saturday.

Badminton Hall 

The Badminton hall 6 competition courts and 4 warm-up courts, and has a seating capacity of 3800. This hall is air conditioned and has a wooden floor. It has changing rooms available and seating & lounges for VIPs. This venue is the home ground of Pune Pistons, a franchise in Indian Badminton League (IBL). So far 3 IBL matches have been played on this venue.

Basketball 
The first edition of FIBA Asia Under-16 Championship for Women was played in this stadium from 30 November 2009 to 6 December 2009. The host, India, finished in fifth position.

It has been a host for the UBA Pro Basketball League, India's top professional basketball division.

Boxing Arena 
The Boxing arena has 3 rings, and 5 warm-up rings, with a seating capacity of 3500. This hall is air conditioned and has changing rooms for players. This arena is the host of 2011 World Series Boxing.

Shooting Range 
The complex has 15 shooting ranges, with a seating capacity of 1500. The ranges are constructed according to ISSF rules. Ranges 50 m, 25 m and 10 m are available

Ranges

Table Tennis Hall 
The hall, with a seating capacity of 1500 people, successfully held World Junior Table Tennis Circuit in September 2008. This has 4 competition tables and 4 warm up tables. This hall is air conditioned and has changing rooms for players. Seating and lounges are for VIPs.

Tennis Court 
The Tennis courts feature one central court and four competition courts, with six warm-up courts. Centre court has a seating capacity of 4200. The stadium hosts the only South Asian ATP 250 series championship named Tata Open Maharashtra every year.

Weightlifting Hall 
This hall has a capacity of 3000. It has hosted the 2009 commonwealth bench press championships. The most famous athlete to compete was Britain's strongest man Paddy the Pac man Jumelle. The hall is air conditioned and has one competition podium and 10 warm-up platforms. Seating and lounges are provided for VIPs. There is also a changing room for competitors.

Wrestling Hall 
The Wrestling Hall, which is used by Kabaddi club Puneri Paltan, has four rings, and six warm-up rings with a seating capacity of 4,400 people. This has seating and lounges for VIPs. This also has changing room for players. This is an air conditioned hall.

Velodrome 

The  velodrome is outdoor and the surface is made of concrete. While it was a prime venue for the 3rd Nationals Games in the year 1993–94 it has never been a place for any major events thereafter, and was left unused. In 2014 it was announced that with a Rs 10 crore maintenance grant from the governments for the entire complex, the facelift of the velodrome had top priority. At that time the velodrome was in dilapidated state.

Games village 
This is a non-sporting venue at the sports city with 400 rooms, ranging between three and five stars.

Other buildings 
The other buildings are as follows:

Cultural Centre

Fitness Centre
This centre has equipment to develop physical and physiological attributes. This hall is air condition hall and has provision for Yoga and Meditation. This has provision for sauna and chill water bath for recovery.

Sports Science Centre
This centre has sauna and chill water bath. This has seven departments:
 Central dope collection centre.
 Department of bio-mechanics.
 Department of nutrition and ergogenic aids.
 Department of physiotherapy.
 Department of Psychology.
 Department of sports rehabilitation.
 Human performance and evolution laboratory.

Teams

Tournaments 

 Major Tournaments

Professional Leagues and Cups

International Sports University, Maharashtra 
In 2020, Maharashtra passed a bill to establish a university named International Sports University, Maharashtra. For this, Pune's Balewadi-based Shree Shiv Chhatrapati Sports Complex will be upgraded to upcoming sports university. University will start functioning in 2021–22.

Other uses

Filmset 
Several scenes for the 2016 film Dangal were filmed at this sports complex in December 2015. The film is about two Indian daughters who won the gold and silver medal in wrestling at the 2010 Commonwealth Games.

References

External links 
International Sports University, Maharashtra act

Sports venues in Pune
Sports venues in Maharashtra
Shooting ranges in India
Sport in Pune
Football venues in Pune
Kabaddi venues in India
Basketball venues in India
Volleyball venues in India
Multi-purpose stadiums in India
1993 establishments in Maharashtra
Field hockey venues in India
Monuments and memorials to Shivaji
Football venues in Maharashtra
Sports complexes
American football venues in India
Sports venues completed in 1993
Sport in Maharashtra
20th-century architecture in India